Alan John Sibbons was an Australian politician who represented the South Australian House of Assembly seat of Mitchell from 2010 to 2014 for the Labor Party.

References

External links

 

Members of the South Australian House of Assembly
Year of birth missing (living people)
Living people
Australian Labor Party members of the Parliament of South Australia
21st-century Australian politicians